Emperor is a red Australian wine grape variety that is mainly grown as a table grape in South Australia and New South Wales but can be a blending component to fill out red blends. It is particularly well suited for hot climate viticulture.

Synonyms
Various synonyms have been used to describe Emperor and its wines including Emperado, Genova, Genova rosa, Red Emperador and Red Emperor.

References

Red wine grape varieties